Talboton is a suburb of Johannesburg, South Africa, around 7 km northeast of City Hall.

It covers 0.08 km² across three blocks and a row of houses on Boundary Road. It borders Percelia Estate to the north, Fairmount to the east, Raedene Estate to the south, and Rouxville and Highlands North to the west. Talboton was established as plot No. 139 of Klipfontein Farm on November 22, 1944. The owner of the township, John Talbot Rowe, named it after himself.

Sources 
 Raper, Peter Edmund (2004). New Dictionary of South African Place Names. Johannesburg/Cape Town: Jonathan Ball Publishers.
 Stals, Prof. Dr. E.L.P (ed.) (1978). Afrikaners in die Goudstad, vol. 1: 1886 - 1924. Cape Town/Pretoria: HAUM.

References 

Suburbs of Johannesburg